Deommodore Lenoir (born October 6, 1999) is an American football cornerback for the San Francisco 49ers of the National Football League (NFL). He played college football at Oregon.

Professional career

Lenoir was drafted by the San Francisco 49ers in the fifth round, 172nd overall, of the 2021 NFL Draft. He signed his four-year rookie contract on May 13, 2021.

2022 season
Lenoir recorded his first career interception during a Week 13 victory against the Miami Dolphins, off of Dolphins' quarterback Tua Tagovailoa.

References

External links
Oregon Ducks bio

Living people
Oregon Ducks football players
Players of American football from Los Angeles
San Francisco 49ers players
1999 births
American football cornerbacks